Villafañe is a Last Name that comes from a small town in the Province of León in Spain, named Villafañe.
Villafaña is not related to the Villafañe's family. Notable people with the surname include:

Ángel de Villafañe (born 1504), Spanish conquistador of Florida, Mexico, and Guatemala
Juan de Arphe y Villafañe (1535–1603), Spanish engraver, goldsmith, artist, anatomist and author
Chunchuna Villafañe (born 1940), Argentine film and television actress
Luis Villafañe (born 1981), Puerto Rican professional basketball player
Santiago Villafañe (born 1988), Argentine footballer who plays for FC Midtjylland

See also
Mayor Vicente Villafañe, settlement in northern Argentina